Auld Ones is an Irish animated television programme broadcast on RTÉ Two. It featured the antics of two Dublin pensioners, Bernie and Mary who sit at a bus stop reminiscing about their youthful adventures. The programme symbolises the tedium and meaninglessness of human life, which loosely connects the characters to one of the themes of existentialist philosophy. Divided into two series, it aired on Mondays at 22:40 and is a Wireless Production.

Characters

Episodes
There are a total of twenty-six episodes aired over two series.

Series one
Series one began broadcasting in September 2003.

Series two
Series two began broadcasting in July 2007.

References

External links

 Official site
 RTÉ site
 A sample episode
 RTÉ press release

2003 Irish television series debuts
2007 Irish television series endings
Irish animated television series
2000s animated television series
RTÉ original programming
Television shows set in the Republic of Ireland